Acianthera serpentula is a species of orchid.

serpentula